The green barbet (Stactolaema olivacea) is a species of bird in the Lybiidae family (African barbets). It is found in Kenya, Tanzania, Malawi, Mozambique and South Africa. Its isolated populations are vulnerable to forest clearing.

Description
They have dull ginger-olive plumage, but are yellower on the wings, and paler below. The head and chin are dark brown in the nominate race, and the eyes vary from dull red to orange. The bill is black and the feet blackish. Juveniles are duller, with brown eyes.

Call
Their call is a repetitive chock, chock, ..., or chop, chop, ..., sometimes in a duet.

Habits
They frequent fruiting branches in the subcanopy, and vary from solitary to social during foraging and roosting. It is a sedentary species which is not known to undertake any movements. It may be particularly dependent on the fruit of wild figs. It breeds in cavities in tree trunks during midsummer.

Taxonomy

The number of races (or species) is not generally agreed upon, and the conservation status of the taxa depends critically on their taxonomic evaluation. Race S. o. hylophona is sometimes merged with woodwardi in a taxon with tentative species status, the so-called Woodward's barbet. These birds have the ear coverts and hind brow marked in yellow, as opposed to the dusky-headed populations. The type was obtained from oNgoye Forest in South Africa, and named for its discoverers, the Woodward brothers. S. o. belcheri, which lacks the yellow ear coverts, is endemic to two isolated inselbergs, and may constitute a third species.

Races
 S. o. olivacea – coastal Kenya to uplands of central Tanzania
 S. o. uluguruensis – Uluguru Mountains of eastern Tanzania
 S. o. howelli – East Udzungwa Mountains in Tanzania
 S. o. rungweensis – Mt Rungwe and Poroto Mts, Tanzania to Misuku Hills, northern Malawi
 S. o. hylophona – the Ngarama, Rondo (where common) and possibly Mitundumbea forest reserves of coastal Tanzania
 S. o. belcheri – Mt Thyolo in Malawi and Mt Namuli in Mozambique
 S. o. woodwardi – oNgoye in KwaZulu-Natal, South Africa

References

green barbet
green barbet
Birds of East Africa
green barbet
Taxonomy articles created by Polbot
Taxobox binomials not recognized by IUCN